The Church of Almighty God, also known as Eastern Lightning, is a monotheistic new religious movement which was established in China in 1991. Government sources estimate the group has three to four million members.

The group's core tenet is that Jesus Christ has returned to earth and is presently living as a Chinese woman.  The name "Eastern Lightning" alludes to the Gospel of Matthew 24:27: "For as the lightning cometh out of the east, and shineth even unto the west; so shall also the coming of the Son of man be."

The movement has been described by Chinese media as the nation's 'most dangerous cult', and the group has been formally banned in China since 1995. Christian opponents and international media have in turn described it as a cult and even as a terrorist organization. In contrast, members of the group deny all accusations and argue they are victims of religious persecution at the hands of Chinese authorities.

Sources
Scholars who have tried to study the group have complained that, due to its "secretive" nature and the fact that in China it operates underground, researching Eastern Lightning is difficult, and media coverage is only partially reliable.

Two books on the group were published by Western academic presses. Brill published Lightning from the East by Emily Dunn in 2015, and Oxford University Press published Inside The Church of Almighty God by Massimo Introvigne in 2020. Holly Folk, a professor at Western Washington University, reported in 2020 that she is observing Eastern Lightning through a participant observation study since 2016.

Due to the growing influx of refugees from Eastern Lightning who seek asylum abroad, some national authorities have published reports on the group. In 2019, the Immigration and Refugee Board of Canada published a compilation of its interviews with scholars about Eastern Lightning. In the same year, the National Commission for the Right of Asylum of the Italian Ministry of the Interior published and shared with the other European Union countries through the European Asylum Support Office a report on "Persecution for religious reasons in China: Church of Almighty God."

History

A woman, whose name is never mentioned in the group's literature, but is believed to be Yang Xiangbin (b. 1973), started spreading in 1991 among Chinese house churches, most of them part of The Shouters, roneotyped texts with revelations she said were coming from the Holy Spirit. Chinese authorities state that Yang had a history of mental problems.

Zhao Weishan (born December 12, 1951), a former physics teacher, had a history of membership in a variety of Christian new religious movements.  In 1986, Zhao was a member of a Christian house church, and in 1987 he was baptized into a branch of The Shouters which venerated their leader Witness Lee as "Lord Changshou".  Zhao rose to a leadership position within the group and, according to Chinese governmental sources, preached that he was himself the "Lord of Ability."

In 1989, the Shouters were labeled a xié jiào (cult or evil cult) by the Chinese government and officially banned. In 1991, Zhao met Yang Xiangbin and quickly became the main leader of her small group, where he was recognized as "the Man used by the Holy Spirit." According to one estimate, by 1991, the organization had more than a thousand members. In 1992, Yang's revelations propagated by Zhao announced that Yang herself was more than a prophetic voice; in fact, she was the second coming of Jesus Christ on earth and the incarnated Almighty God. Since then, Yang was referred to as "he" rather than "she," as she was in fact regarded as Jesus Christ. Chinese media started taking an interest in the sect, and referred to Yang (sometimes also mentioned as "Deng"), as "the female Christ."

In 1995, the group was classified as a xie jiao by China's Ministry of Public Security.  On September 6, 2000, both Zhao and Yang entered the United States; they were granted political asylum the following year. Since then, they live in and direct the movement from New York.

Beliefs
Eastern Lightning holds that Jesus has returned as a Chinese woman, worshiped by the sect as Almighty God, hence its official name. The group is non-Trinitarian, and teaches a form of millennialism. The group publishes the revelations of its female Almighty God; most of them are collected in The Word Appears in the Flesh. The group is anti-Communist, identifying the Great Red Dragon of the Book of Revelation with the Chinese Communist Party.

The Church describes human history as "God's six-thousand year management plan," divided in three stages: the Age of Law, when God as Jehovah guided Israel; the Age of Grace, when God as Jesus Christ saved humanity, but did not eradicate its sinful nature; and the Age of Kingdom, inaugurated in 1991, when God in his present incarnation as Almighty God reveals the fullness of truth and works to free humans from their sinfulness. Also, the group mentions a future Age of Millennial Kingdom, in which the earth will enter after the death of the present divine incarnation, and will be transformed into a kingdom of peace and joy.

According to Holly Folk, an associate professor at Western Washington University that has been studying the Church, it does not view the Bible as God's word but as a human work with flaws.

Organization
According to sociologist Fenggang Yang, Eastern Lighting is organized hierarchically, with "inspectors" overseeing regional and subregional leaders, who in turn oversee the leaders of the local congregations. At the local and regional levels, leaders are elected by the members.

Members get together weekly (but not on a fixed day of the week) in what they call "fellowship meetings," in private homes in China and in "community houses," sometimes called "churches," abroad. There, they pray, read and discuss the revelations of Almighty God, sing hymns, hear sermons, and sometimes present artistic performances. Holly Folk, an associate professor at Western Washington University, said that "a lot of their international ministry functions as an internet religion".

Starting in 2001, the group began efforts to proselytize online by creating websites which host church scripture in various languages, links to group chats, and news about online events. The group is also present on social media.

Repression in China
Eastern Lightning is banned in China and proselyting or organizing meetings on its behalf is a crime prosecuted under Article 300 of the Chinese Criminal Code. The United States Department of State in its Report on International Religious Freedom for the year 2018, published on June 21, 2019, reported claims that in 2018, Chinese "authorities arrested 11,111 of its [Eastern Lightning] members," and "subjected 525 of its members to 'torture or forced indoctrination,'" mentioning that some were "tortured to death while in custody". In its Report on International Religious Freedom for the year 2019, published on June 10, 2020, the same U.S. Department of State mentioned claims that in 2019, "at least 32,815 Church members were directly persecuted by authorities, compared with 23,567 in 2018," and "at least 19 Church members died as a result of abuse (20 in 2018)." The United States Commission on International Religious Freedom reported that "in 2018, the Chinese government harassed and arrested thousands of followers of [...] the Church of Almighty God. Many of those detained during the year [2018] suffered torture and other abuses, in some cases resulting in deaths or unexplained disappearances while in custody."

Controversies
Eastern Lightning has been described by Chinese media as the nation's "most dangerous cult". The group has been accused of ties to violence. In 2020, an article published in The Daily Beast  by veteran reporter Donald Kirk found that Western scholars who have written about Eastern Lightning tend to support the sect's position that it has been unfairly accused.

2002 Mass-kidnapping
In 2002, The Church of Almighty God was accused of staging a campaign of simultaneous kidnappings across multiple cities to capture thirty-four leaders of the China Gospel Fellowship (CGF). Eastern Lightning denied the accusations, and scholar Emily Dunn concluded in her 2015 book that rogue members of the sect, acting without the approval of the leaders, might have been responsible for the incident, writing that, "While Eastern Lightning's leadership evidently does not condone the use of violence, it may be unable to impress this upon some followers." Massimo Introvigne in his book published in 2020 suggested that China Gospel Fellowship members described as "kidnapping" what was in fact "deception," as they were invited, and went (voluntarily, according to Introvigne), to training sessions without being told that they were organized by Eastern Lightning.

2012 doomsday riots
Some members of Eastern Lightning embraced the so-called Mayan prophecy and predicted the end of the world for 2012. The authorities accused them of causing riots and even crimes around China. According to Emily Dunn, the  2012 predictions were accepted by some sect members "without sanctions from [Eastern Lightning] authorities," who pointed out that in their theology there is no end of the world, and reprimanded and even expelled members who insisted in spreading the Mayan prophecy. Immediately prior to the supposed doomsday date of December 21, 2012, the Chinese government arrested 400 members of Eastern Lightning in central China, and as many as 1000 from other provinces of China. Chinese authorities also claimed that a certain Min Yongjun, who stabbed an elderly woman and 23 students at a school in Henan province, was motivated by the 2012 prophecies, and after the incident occurred pointed out that Eastern Lightning members were among those propagating these prophecies.

2014 Murder of Wu Shuoyan

Wu Shuoyan (1977–2014), a 37-year-old woman who worked as a salesperson in a nearby clothing store, was waiting after work to meet her husband and seven-year-old son in the mall McDonald's.  While Wu was there, a group of six persons (including a 12-year-old), entered the restaurant.  They announced that they were "missionaries." After presenting their religious message, they demanded that customers supply their cell phone numbers for future contacts. Wu was twice asked to provide her phone number. She refused.

Wu was then beaten by two of the "missionaries", who used mops the group had brought with them. A chair was thrown at Wu, and her head and face were stomped. One attacker screamed "Go die! Evil spirit!" while another shouted at customers: "Whoever interferes will die!". The attack was captured on camera, with footage widely shared online. Wu died from her injuries at the scene.

The attackers were arrested and identified by the government as members of Eastern Lightning. Representatives from Eastern Lightning publicly condemned the murder, claiming it had been committed by "psychopaths" who had nothing to do with them. In the wake of the murder, authorities in China engaged in widespread arrests of Eastern Lightning's members. The five adult attackers were found guilty at trial, with two of the murderers being executed for their role in 2015.

Covering the trial and the confessions of the accused assassins, reporters for the Chinese daily The Beijing News wrote that the perpetrators were in fact not members of Eastern Lightning at the time of the murder: they recognized as the living incarnation of God, rather than Yang Xiangbin, their own two female leaders, regarded as one divine soul in two bodies, and claimed that Eastern Lightning was a cult while theirs was a  legitimate religious group. Some Western scholars who wrote about Eastern Lightning also concluded that the perpetrators at the time of the murder were  members of a group different from Eastern Lightning. In 2017, Chinese authorities announced that two of the assassins had been successfully "re-educated" in jail. Although they maintained that theirs was a group based on the belief that the two female leaders of their movement, not Yang Xiangbin, were the real Almighty God, they also blamed books and Web sites of Eastern Lightning for having "ideologically corrupted" them in their youth.

2019 Israeli election
In weeks before the 2019 Israeli election, as reported by BuzzFeed News, Twitter suspended dozens of Hebrew-language accounts run in The Church of Almighty God's name that were amplifying right-wing religious and political messages. The BuzzFeed article reported the opinion of Holly Folk, that the political activity was "outside the pattern of CAG's [Church of Almighty God's] typical behavior," and the accounts might have been created by Chinese agencies to discredit Eastern Lightning.

See also

 Heterodox teachings (Chinese law)
 Christianity in China

Notes

References

Citations

Sources 

 Aikman, David (2003). Jesus in Beijing: How Christianity Is Transforming China and Changing the Global Balance of Power. Washington D.C.: Regnery. .
 BBC News (2014). "China Cult Murder Trail: Two Members Sentenced to Death." October 11, 2014.
 Brown, Loretta (2020). "Coronavirus Creates New Problems for China's Persecuted Religious Minorities", National Catholic Register, February 6, 2020.
 Chan, Lois, and Steve Bright (2005). "Deceived by the Lightning". The Christian Research Journal, 28,3. 
 People's Daily (2014)."Inside China's 'Eastern Lightning' Cult." June 3, 2014. 
 China Youth Daily Staff Writers (2017). "招远麦当劳杀人案女犯忏悔记：两年写几万字揭批材料 (Confession by the Main Criminal of the McDonald's Murder in Zhaoyuan: She Has Compiled Writings of Revelation and Criticism Amounting to Tens of Thousands Characters in Two Years)". The Beijing News, May 26. (Accessed February 22, 2020).
 Dunn, Emily C. (2008a). "'Cult,' Church, and the CCP: Introducing Eastern Lightning." Modern China 35(1):96–119. .
 Dunn, Emily (2008b). "The Big Red Dragon and Indigenizations of Christianity in China." East Asian History 36: 73–85. .
 Dunn, Emily (2015). Lightning from the East: Heterodoxy and Christianity in Contemporary China. Leiden: Brill. .
 Dunn, Emily (2016). "Reincarnated Religion? The Eschatology of the Church of Almighty God in Comparative Perspective." Studies in World Christianity, 22(3):216–233. ..
 Fautré, Willy (2018). "Religious refugees from China denied asylum in Europe". The Parliament Magazine (Brussels), January 9, 2018.
 Gracie Carrie (2014). "Chasing China's Doomsday Cult." BBC News, August 14, 2014.
 Immigration and Refugee Board of Canada (2019). "China: Update of CHN106256 of 23 September 2019 on the Church of Almighty God (CAG) (quan neng shen jiao; Quannengshen), also known as 'Eastern Lightning'".
 Introvigne, Massimo (2020). Inside The Church of Almighty God: The Most Persecuted Religious Movement in China. New York and Oxford, UK: Oxford University Press. .
 Irvine, Chris (ed.) (2014). "Chinese Boy Whose Eyes Were Gouged Out Fitted with Prosthetic Eyeballs." The Telegraph, December 12, 2013. 
 Jacobs, Andrew (2012). "Chatter of Doomsday Makes Beijing Nervous." The New York Times, December 19, 2012.
 Kindopp, Jason (2004). "Fragmented yet Defiant: Protestant Resilience under Chinese Communist Party Rule." In God and Caesar in China: Policy Implications of Church-State Tension, edited by Jason Kindopp and Carol Lee Hamrin, 122–145. Washington D.C.: Brookings Institution Press. .
 Kirk, Donald (2020). "These Chinese Christians Were Branded A Criminal 'Cult.' Now They Have to Flee." The Daily Beast, February 9, 2020.
 Lai, Ting-heng [and others] (2014). "Chinese Doomsday Cult Expands to Taiwan". Want China Times (Taiwan), June 2, 2014.
 Li, Cao (2014). "招遠血案讓全能神教再入公眾視野 (Zhaoyuan Blood Case Brings into Public View the Case of the Reincarnation of the Almighty God)." The New York Times (Chinese edition), June 3, 2014. 
 Ma, Xingrui (2014). "马兴瑞同志在省委防范和处理邪教问题领导小组全体成员会议上的讲话 (Comrade Ma Xingrui's Speech on the Plenary Meeting of the CPC Guangdong Provincial Committee Leading Group on Preventing and Controlling Cults, July 9, 2014)." Reproduced on the website of the Association for the Protection of Human Rights and Religious Freedom.
 McLeister, Marc (2018). "Emily Dunn. Lightning from the East: Heterodoxy and Christianity in Contemporary China." Studies in World Christianity, 24(1), 89–90.
 Ministero dell'Interno, Commissione Nazionale per il Diritto d'Asilo (2019). "Persecuzioni per motivi religiosi in China, Church of Almighty God".
 Palmer, David Alexander (2012). "Heretical Doctrines, Reactionary Secret Societies, Evil Cults: Labelling Heterodoxy in 20th-Century China." In Chinese Religiosities: The Vicissitudes of Modernity and State Formation, edited by Mayfair Yang, 113–134. Berkeley and Los Angeles: University of California Press. .
 Patranobis, Sutirtho (2012). "400 Members of Doomsday Cult Held in Central China." Hindustan Times, December 20, 2012.
 Shen, Xiaoming, and Eugene Bach (2017). Kidnapped by a Cult: A Pastor's Stand Against a Murderous Sect. New Kensington, Pennsylvania: Whitaker House. .
 Sina Video (2014). "视频：招远案嫌疑犯接受采访全程-我感觉很好 (Video: Zhaoyuan Case Suspect Interviewed in Depth – 'I Feel Good.'") May 31, 2014.
 The Beijing News (2014). "山东招远血案被告自白：我就是神, The Confession of the Defendant of the Murder Case in Zhaoyuan, Shandong: 'I Am God Himself.'" August 23, 2014. Compiled by Yang Feng (Accessed August 22, 2018).
 Thompson, John (2018). "Cults, New Christianities and Religious Persecution in the Internet Age; a Q&A with Holly Folk". Western Today (Western Washington University), January 29, 2020.
 Tiezzi, Shannon (2014). "China's Other Religious Problem: Christianity." The Diplomat, June 3, 2014.
 U.S. Department of State (2019) Country Reports on Religious Freedom – China. (Accessed March 11, 2020).
 U.S. Department of State (2020). Country Reports on Religious Freedom - China. (Accessed June 16, 2020).
 USCIRF (United States Commission on International Religious Freedom) (2019).  2019 Annual Report. Washington DC: United States Commission on International Religious Freedom.
 Xiao, Hui and Zhang, Yongsheng (2014). "一个 '全能神教'家庭的发展史 (History of the Family of Almighty God Group)". The Beijing News, August 22. (Accessed February 22, 2020).
 Yang, Feng (2014). "山东招远血案被告自白：我就是神, The Confession of the Defendant of the Murder Case in Zhaoyuan, Shandong: 'I am God Himself.'" The Beijing News, August 23. (Accessed 22 February 2020).
 Yang, Fenggang, with J.E.E. Pettit (2018). Atlas of Religion in China: Social and Geographical Contexts. Leiden: Brill. .
 Wee, Sui-Lee, and Robert Birsel (2012). "China detains 93 for doomsday rumors: Xinhua". Reuters, December 17.

External links
 
 

1989 establishments in China
Apocalyptic groups
Christian new religious movements
Christian denominations founded in China
Religious organizations established in 1989
Self-declared messiahs
Chinese cults